Golden Arm is a 2020 comedy film directed by Maureen Bharoocha and written by Ann Marie Allison and Jenna Milly. It stars Mary Holland, Betsy Sodaro, Dot-Marie Jones, Kate Flannery, Olivia Stambouliah, Dawn Luebbe, Ron Funches, and Eugene Cordero. It was originally set to premiere at the 2020 South by Southwest festival, which was cancelled due to the COVID-19 pandemic. The film was released by Utopia in select theaters and on demand on April 30, 2021.

Plot 
A struggling baker in a small town takes her friend's advice to train for the Ladies Arm Wrestling Championship and its prize of $15,000.

Cast 
 Mary Holland as Melanie
 Betsy Sodaro as Danny
 Dot-Marie Jones as Big Sexy
 Kate Flannery as Randy
 Olivia Stambouliah as Brenda
 Dawn Luebbe as Tessie
 Ron Funches as Carl
 Eugene Cordero as Greg
 Ahmed Bharoocha as Jerry
 Aparna Nancherla as Coco Cherie

Reception

References

External links 

 

2020 films
Films about women's sports
2020s English-language films
American sports comedy films
2020s American films